This is a list of properties and districts in Terrell County, Georgia that are listed on the U.S. National Register of Historic Places (NRHP).

Current listings

|}

Former listings

|}

References

Terrell
Terrell County, Georgia